The USA Women's National Team XVs is the senior national team for the United States in the 15-a-side version of rugby. The team was officially formed in 1987 and is nicknamed the Eagles.

An international powerhouse during the 1990s— the Eagles won the inaugural 1991 Women's World Cup and finished second in the two following World Cups in 1994 and 1998. The team finished fourth at the 2017 Rugby World Cup in Ireland.

In May 2018, Rob Cain was appointed full-time Head Coach. Cain joined the Eagles after winning the inaugural Tyrell Premier 15s title in England with Saracens Women.

History

(Source: US Women's Rugby Foundation)

The history of women's rugby in the United States can be traced back to three teams that existed in 1972 – the Colorado State University Hookers at Fort Collins; the University of Colorado, at Boulder; and the University of Illinois, at Champaign. During the mid-1970s women's teams began to spring up on college campuses across the United States. As those players graduated they went on to set up teams near cities and urban centers. At that time there was only one division for all women's rugby. In 1975 United States Rugby Football Union was formed and contained four territories. At this time the women had their own Board of Directors and followed in parallel USARFU with four territories (East, Midwest, West and Pacific). In 1978 the first Women's National Championships was held. The Chicago Women's Rugby Club in Chicago, Illinois hosted this event. The winner of that championship was Portland, Maine.

1980s–1997

In 1985 the first semblance of a national team was formed. An ‘invitation-only’ team was put together and made up of, arguably, the top women playing the game at the time. The team was named WIVERN and toured throughout England and France. The team finished the tour undefeated. Many of these players went on to be selected to the 1991 World Cup Team.

In 1987 the USA women's national team was officially born with their first match against the Canadian women's national team. Although the women were not permitted to wear the Eagle logo, this match was sanctioned by Rugby Canada and USA Rugby. USA and Canada began holding an annual match, which became known as the CanAm series. For ten years the Women Eagles went undefeated in this test series.

In 1990 the women's national team, competing under the name ‘USA Presidents 15’, traveled to New Zealand to compete in the historic Women's World Rugby Festival. The WNT posted a record of 3–1 with their only loss coming at the hands of New Zealand. In 1991 the first Women's Rugby World Cup was held in Cardiff, Wales. Coached by Beantown's Kevin O’Brien, a Welshman himself, and Minnesota's Chris Leach, a South African the stage was set for the US women to bring home the Cup. Defeating New Zealand in semi-final play, the USA women advanced to the finals where they defeated England. Also in 1991 the first woman was elected to serve on the USARFU Board of Directors. Jamie Jordan was elected Treasurer for the Board.

In 1997 The U23 women's national team was formed. USA Women's National Team Head Coach Franck Boivert appointed Penn State Coach Peter Steinberg to be Head Coach for the U23 Women's National Team program. At an event in the CanAm Series the US Women's National Team celebrated their 10-year anniversary by cheering on the Women's U23 National Team in their first test against Canada.

Present
The USA Women's National Team XVs finished fourth at Rugby World Cup 2017 in Ireland which earned them automatic qualification to the next World Cup in New Zealand in 2021. In early 2018, the program hired former Women's National Team player Emilie Bydwell to serve as its General Manager of Women's High Performance. Soon after in May, Rob Cain was appointed full-time Head Coach and has since helped lead the program in a new direction.

The Women's National Team Program fields a number of age-grade and development programs including the High School All-Americans (U18), Under-20s, Collegiate All-Americans and USA Selects. All age-grade and development programs are umbrellaed under the national team program and serve as a feeder to the senior Women's Eagles.

Record

Overall
See List of United States women's national rugby union team matches
Full internationals only
Correct as of 09 October 2022

Rugby World Cup

Players

Current squad 
The United States named their final 32-player squad on the 16 September 2022, for the 2021 Rugby World Cup. Alycia Washington, Rachel Ehrecke, Bulou Mataitoga and Saher Hamdan were named as non-travelling reserves.

Previous squads

Notable players 
Two former Eagles have been inducted into the World Rugby Hall of Fame: Patty Jervey and Phaidra Knight.

Patty Jervey was inducted in 2014. She was the first player to play in five Women's Rugby World Cups. She won the inaugural tournament in 1991 and appeared in the 1994, 1998, 2002 and 2006 editions. She made her Eagles debut in 1989 and has won 40 caps, and scored 178 points.

Phaidra Knight was inducted in 2017. She has been capped 35 times for the Eagles and has appeared at three Women's Rugby World Cups – 2002, 2006 and 2010. She was named USA Rugby Player of the Decade in 2010. Knight also represented the USA Women's Sevens, from 2006 to 2009.

Coaches

See also
Women's Premier League Rugby
Rugby union in the United States
Women's international rugby – the most complete listing of all women's international results since 1982

References

External links
 

 
Women's national rugby union teams
North American national women's rugby union teams